Dorothée de Monfreid (born 1973) is a French author and illustrator. She worked as a graphic designer, before beginning to work on children's books. She is best known for illustrating I Really Want to Eat a Child. In addition to her work on children's books, Dorothée also creates comics and is an accomplished ukulele player. She lives and works in Paris.

Recent English publications
2014 – The Cake, 32pp., 
2015 – Shhh! I'm Sleeping, 24pp., 
2016 – A Day With Dogs, 64pp.,

References

External links

Dorothée's blog
English author page

1973 births
Living people
French children's book illustrators
French children's writers
French women children's writers
21st-century French women writers
French illustrators
French women illustrators
French graphic designers